Alec Baillie (died November 10, 2020) was an American bassist.  He played in the bands Choking Victim, Agent 99, and Leftöver Crack.

Biography
Baillie grew up in Manhattan and attended the same high school as his future bandmate Scott "Stza" Sturgeon. In the early 1990s, Baillie, Dunia Best, Jay Nugent and Ara Babajian formed the third wave ska band, Agent 99. In 1998, three years after the band had split up, a compilation album, Little Pieces 1993–1995, was released. Baillie then formed a short lived punk band called No Commercial Value with Stza. Baillie later joined Stza's band Choking Victim after the departure of original bassist Sascha Scatter, and went on to play in Choking Victim from 1995 to 1997.

Upon the dissolution of Choking Victim, Baillie went on to join a familiar lineup in Leftöver Crack. Its members include Stza and Ezra, both of whom played with Baillie in the now defunct Choking Victim.

Baillie died on November 10, 2020. He was reportedly on suicide watch the night before, but the official cause of death is listed as accidental drug overdose of heroin, buprenorphine and alprazolam.

Discography

References

External links
 

American punk rock bass guitarists
2020 deaths
American punk rock musicians
Anarcho-punk musicians
Place of death missing
Place of birth missing
American male bass guitarists
Year of birth missing
Choking Victim members
Leftöver Crack members